Socialist Movement Pakistan (SMP) is a Trotskyist political party in Pakistan affiliated to the Committee for a Workers' International.

The SMP was formally founded in Lahore on 17 April 2004, with the merger of the United Socialist Party (a sympathising section of the CWI) and the Marxist Workers' Tendency.

The SMP is highly critical of US policy and involvement in Pakistan, but likewise condemns Islamic fundamentalist groups such as the Taliban, which it considers to be dangerously reactionary.

The party supported in the Occupy movement in Pakistan.

Elections
In 2005, there were 11 SMP members elected to local councils in Pakistan, 8 in Karachi and one each in Dadu, Shikarpur and Dir, winning over 15,000 votes.

SMP is planning on using the upcoming elections to agitate for the need for a new workers party, and are holding a conference of trade unionists on the issue in March, 2008.

Trade Unions
SMP members were in the leadership of the campaign to stop the privatisation of the Pakistan Telecommunication Company Ltd (PTCL) and the party has been a long time supporter of PTCL workers.

SMP also founded the Trade Union Rights Campaign Pakistan (TURCP), which had its founding conference in November 2005, with over 300 trade unions leaders and activists in attendance.

References

External links
Socialist Movement Pakistan
Committee for a Workers' International
2004 establishments in Pakistan
Communist parties in Pakistan
Far-left politics in Pakistan
Political parties established in 2004
Pakistan
Trotskyism in Pakistan
Trotskyist organizations in Asia